Rosanna Phelps Warren (born July 27, 1953) is an American poet and scholar.

Biography
Warren is the daughter of novelist, literary critic and Poet Laureate Robert Penn Warren and writer Eleanor Clark.  She graduated from Yale University, where she was a member of Manuscript Society, in 1976, with a degree in painting, and then in 1980 received an M.A. from Johns Hopkins Writing Seminars. Until July 2012 she was the Emma MacLachlan Metcalf Professor of the Humanities and a University Professor at Boston University.

Warren's first collection of poetry, Each Leaf Shines Separate (1984), received generally favorable notice in a review in The New York Times.  Her next collection, Stained Glass, won the Lamont Poetry Prize for the best second volume published in the U. S. in 1993; in his review, Jonathan Aaron described these poems "tough-minded, beautifully crafted meditations". Warren was awarded the Metcalf Award for Excellence in Teaching at Boston University in 2004.  She held a Lannan Foundation Marfa residency in 2005.

In the 2008–09 academic year, Warren was a fellow of the Dorothy and Lewis B. Cullman Center for Scholars and Writers at the New York Public Library. Warren is currently the Hanna Holborn Gray Distinguished Service Professor in the Committee on Social Thought at the University of Chicago.

Family 
On December 21, 1981, Warren married Stephen Scully, but is now divorced. She has two daughters. Her younger daughter, Chiara Scully, graduated from Yale University, and is pursuing a writing career of her own.  Her poetry has been published in the Seneca Review  and The New Republic. Her elder daughter, Katherine Scully, also graduated from Yale University and is a lawyer.

Awards 
Warren's other awards include several Pushcart Prizes, the American Academy of Arts and Letters Award of Merit in Poetry, the Witter Bynner Poetry Prize (1993), the Sara Teasdale Award in Poetry (2011), and a Guggenheim Fellowship. In 1990 she served as poet in residence at The Frost Place in Franconia, New Hampshire. She is a member of The American Academy of Arts and Letters, the American Philosophical Society, and The American Academy of Arts and Sciences, and has served as Chancellor of the Academy of American Poets. In spring of 2006 she received a Berlin Prize to fund half a year of study and work at the American Academy in Berlin.

Bibliography

Poetry

Collections

List of poems

Criticism

Translations
   Translator with Stephen Scully, The Suppliants (Euripides)

Non-Fiction

References

External links
 Official Website: rosannawarren.com
 Boston University page
 Biography at poets.org
 Interview at The Kenyon Review
 Rosanna Warren, Ploughshares, the literary journal
 Audio: Rosanna Warren reads 'Simile' from Departure
 Committee on Social Thought at the University of Chicago
 Who Speaks for the Negro Vanderbilt documentary website

1953 births
American women poets
American translation scholars
Boston University faculty
Fellows of the American Academy of Arts and Sciences
Johns Hopkins University alumni
Living people
Yale University alumni
Writers from Fairfield, Connecticut
The New Yorker people
20th-century American poets
20th-century American women writers
20th-century American translators
21st-century American poets
21st-century American women writers
Poets from Connecticut
Members of the American Philosophical Society
Members of the American Academy of Arts and Letters
Milton Academy alumni
American women academics